Justice Haines may refer to:

Daniel Haines (1801–1877), associate justice of the New Jersey Supreme Court
Frank D. Haines (1866–1959), associate justice of the Connecticut Supreme Court

See also
Judge Haines (disambiguation)